Hòa Thạnh is a ward of Tân Phú District in Ho Chi Minh City, Vietnam.

References

Populated places in Ho Chi Minh City